Magne Hovden (born 23 October 1974) is a Norwegian writer. He is also an independent literary agent and has previously worked as translator. He has written one children's books, Pugg's Diary, and humour books.

He currently lives in Kirkenes, in the far north of Norway.

Bibliography
 Leif J@nsson: ville spørsmål og reflekterte svar, 2006
 Ruben, 2007
 Puggs Dagbok, 2009
 Sameland, 2010
 MGP, 2011

References

External links
 
Magne Hovden at Aschehoug Publishing House
Sameland's website
Magne Hovden's fan page on Facebook

1974 births
Living people
Norwegian writers